Supernanny is an American reality television program that aired on ABC from 2005 to 2011 and Lifetime in 2020. The ages of the children are the ages they were at the time the show was broadcast. This list does not include the episodes of its American spin-off, America's Supernanny.

Series overview

Episodes

Season 1 (2005)

Season 2 (2005–06)

Season 3 (2006–07)

Season 4 (2008)

Season 5 (2008–09)

Season 6 (2009–10)

Season 7 (2010–11)

Season 8 (2020)

Specials (2008–10)

References 

Lists of reality television series episodes
Lists of American non-fiction television series episodes